Zoma Bealoka is a town and commune in Madagascar. It belongs to the district of Miarinarivo, which is a part of Itasy Region. The population of the commune was estimated to be approximately 10,000 in 2001 commune census.

The majority 95% of the population of the commune are farmers.  The most important crop is rice, while other important products are maize and cassava. Services provide employment for 5% of the population.

References and notes 

Populated places in Itasy Region